The Spanish city of Bilbao contains a dense urban rail network served by multiple operators, track gauges and types. It is one of a very small number of cities (also including Helsinki and Tallinn) that have both narrow and broad gauge railways without any standard gauge railways. 

It currently consists of thirteen lines, counting those of metro and tram as well as suburban rail; complemented by a wide-covering bus network, as well as other means of transportation including funiculars. The services are offered by different companies, whose activity is coordinated by the Consorcio de Transportes de Bizkaia (Transport Consortium of Bizkaia), which integrates their respective operators and facilitates and encourages their use.

The three major operators of the rail transport network are Metro Bilbao (2 lines), Euskotren (5 Euskotren Trena lines and 1 Euskotren Tranbia line) and Renfe (3 lines of Cercanías Bilbao and 2 of Renfe Feve). The lines converge in the capital and reach six of the seven regions of the province: Arratia-Nervión, Busturialdea-Urdaibai, Duranguesado, Gran Bilbao, Las Encartaciones and Uribe. Thus, the only region without rail lines is Lea-Artibai. Areas that lack rail service are served by Bizkaibus.

Services

Metro 24x24px 

Bilbao's first metro line opened in 1995, has been expanded continually over the years and attracted a ridership of 90 million passengers in 2018. Service is provided by two operators; Metro Bilbao (L1, L2) and Euskotren (L3). Interchange between the two operators is provided at Zazpikaleak/Casco Viejo station.

Commuter rail

Euskotren Trena   

Euskotren is the designation given to the metre-gauge network owned by the Basque Government. The entire  network uses  narrow gauge rail tracks which have been owned by the Basque Government since their transferral from the Spanish government; the rail tracks and stations were part of the Feve network until its transferral. In 2018 the system carried 22,484,083 passengers.

Renfe Cercanías ("Aldiriak")  

Cercanías Bilbao (Basque: Bilboko Aldiriak) is a commuter rail network in Bilbao, serving the city and its metropolitan area. It is operated by Cercanías, as part of Renfe, the national railway company. It consists of three lines, named C-1, C-2 and C-3. All three of them start at Bilbao-Abando station, which is the central station of the city. The service was used by over 10 million passengers in 2017.(2017) Renfe Feve operates two commuter rail lines from Bilbao Concordia station, adjacent to Abando.

Tram  

Euskotren operates one tram line of fourteen stops in Bilbao city centre.

References

Rail transport in Spain
Transport in Spain